Pilosocereus quadricentralis is a species of Pilosocereus found in Oaxaca and Chiapas States of Mexico.

References

External links

quadricentralis
Flora of Mexico